CD7 (Cluster of Differentiation 7) is a protein that in humans is encoded by the CD7 gene.

Function 
This gene encodes a transmembrane protein which is a member of the immunoglobulin superfamily. This protein is found on thymocytes and mature T cells. It plays an essential role in T-cell interactions and also in T-cell/B-cell interaction during early lymphoid development.

See also 
 Cluster of differentiation

Interactions 
CD7 has been shown to interact with PIK3R1.

Clinical significance 
CD7 can be aberrantly expressed in refractory anaemia with excess blasts (RAEB) and may confer a worse prognosis. Also, a lack of CD7 expression could insinuate mycosis fungoides (MF) or Sezary syndrome (SS).

References

Further reading

External links 

 

Clusters of differentiation